Jan Simoen (born 9 December 1953) is a Belgian former professional footballer who played as a forward.

Honours

Player 
AS Oostende
 Belgian Third Division: 1972–73 (promotion to Second Division as champion)
 Belgian Second Division: 1973–74 (promotion to First Division as runner-up)

Club Brugge Belgian First Division: 1977–78
 Belgian Cup: runner-up 1978–79
 European Champion Clubs' Cup: runner-up 1977–78
 Jules Pappaert Cup: 1978Sint-Niklase S.K.'''
 Belgian Third Division: 1981–82 (promotion to Second Division as champion)
 Belgian Second Division: 1983–84 (promotion to First Division as champion)

References 

1953 births
Living people
People from Nieuwpoort, Belgium
Belgian footballers
Association football forwards
Belgian Pro League players
A.S.V. Oostende K.M. players
Club Brugge KV players
K.S.K. Beveren players
Cercle Brugge K.S.V. players
K. Sint-Niklase S.K.E. players
Footballers from West Flanders